The 1950 Vermont gubernatorial election took place on November 7, 1950. Incumbent Republican Harold J. Arthur, who had become governor following the resignation of Ernest W. Gibson Jr., did not run for a full term as Governor of Vermont. Republican candidate Lee E. Emerson defeated Democratic candidate J. Edward Moran and succeeded Arthur.

Republican primary

Candidates
Peter Bove, Chief of the Vermont Liqour Board
Lee E. Emerson, former Lieutenant Governor of Vermont
J. Harold Stacey, Speaker of the Vermont House of Representatives

Endorsements

Results

Democratic primary

Results

General election

Candidates
Lee E. Emerson (Republican), former Lieutenant Governor of Vermont
John Edward Moran (Democratic), Mayor of Burlington

Results

References

Vermont
1950
Gubernatorial
November 1950 events in the United States